The year 2007 in art involved some significant events and new works.

Events
 April - The Museo Alameda opens in San Antonio, Texas, U.S.A
 10 June – 21 November – 52nd Venice Biennale.
 October - Execution by Yue Minjun sells at Sotheby's in London for £2.9 million pounds (US $5.9 million - euro 4.2 million) making it most expensive artwork ever sold by a Chinese contemporary artist.
 18 October – In New York City, the Salander-O'Reilly Galleries is forced into closure on the evening of the opening of a major Caravaggio exhibition, amidst scandal and lawsuits.
 22 October – In Amersfoort (Netherlands) a fire at the Armando museum destroys 63 paintings from the permanent and loan collections. 
 2 November – Nightwatching, Peter Greenaway's film about Rembrandt, is released. It is the first film in Greenaway's series "Dutch Masters".
 14 November – Sotheby's sells La Fuensanta by Julio Romero de Torres to a private collector.
 20 December – The Pablo Picasso painting Portrait of Suzanne Bloch, together with Candido Portinari's O Lavrador de Café, is stolen from the São Paulo Museum of Art. It is recovered about three weeks later.

Exhibitions
23 January - 13 May - "Martin Ramirez at the American Folk Art Museum in New York City
10 May–28 July - “Universal Language & the Avant-Garde: Viking Eggeling, Hans Richter, and Jonas Mekas” at the Maya Stendhal gallery in New York City
14 June-16 September - National Portrait Gallery, "BP Portrait Award 2007"
23 June until 16 September - Hans Schabus: Deserted Conquest at SITE Santa Fe in Santa Fe, New Mexico
September-December - Garden in Transit, a public art exhibit, is displayed on New York City taxis between September 2007 and December 2007

Awards
Archibald Prize – John Beard, Portrait of Janet Laurence
Arts & Cultural Council for Greater Rochester Artist of the Year – Manuel Rivera-Ortiz
Caldecott Medal – David Wiesner, Flotsam
Turner Prize – Mark Wallinger, State Britain
Venice Biennale – (June 10 - November 21)
Lion d'Or Golden Lion for Lifetime Achievement:Malick Sidibé (Mali)
Lion d'Or for Best Pavilion: Andreas Fogarasi (Hungary)
Wynne prize – Philip Wolfhagen, Winter Nocturne IV

Works

 Sanford Biggers - Blossom
 Ed Dwight – Statue of Martin Luther King Jr. (sculpture, Houston, Texas)
Russ Faxon – Statue of John Stith Pemberton (sculpture, Atlanta)
 Valerie Hegarty - Fallen Bierstadt (after A Storm in the Rocky Mountains, Mt. Rosalie by Albert Bierstadt)
 David Hockney – Bigger Trees Near Warter
 Zhang Huan - Three Legged Buddha (sculpture)
 Maya Lin - Above and Below (sculpture, Indianapolis Museum of Art)
John Ney Michel and Christopher Liberatos – Statue of William Moultrie (sculpture, Charleston, South Carolina)
 Stephen Kettle – Alan Turing statue (sculpture in slate, Bletchley Park, England)
 Jo Ractliffe – Roadside stall on the way to Viana (photograph)
 Ian Rank-Broadley – The Stretcher Bearers and The Gates (bronzes, Armed Forces Memorial, Staffordshire, England)
 Neo Rauch
 Hunter's Room
 Waiting for the Barbarians
Allison Saar – "Swing Low" – Harriet Tubman Memorial (Harriet Tubman Plaza,  Harlem, Manhattan, New York City)
 Doris Salcedo – Shibboleth (installation at Tate Modern, London)
 Luke Sullivan – The Fourth Secret of Fatima (sculpture)
 James Turrell – Dividing the Light (installation at Pomona College, Claremont, California, United States)

Deaths

January to March
8 January – Iwao Takamoto, Japanese American animator, television producer and film director (b.1925).
11 January – Bryan Pearce, English naïve painter (b.1929).
20 January – Dan Christensen, American abstract painter (b.1942).
4 February – Jules Olitski, American abstract painter, printmaker, and sculptor (b.1922).
14 February – Emmett Williams, American poet and Fluxus artist (b.1925).
22 February
Lothar-Günther Buchheim, German author, painter, and art collector (b.1918).
Miriam Mone, Northern Irish fashion designer (b.1965; ovarian cancer).
2 March – Madi Phala, South African artist (b.1955).
6 March – Jean Baudrillard, French cultural theorist, sociologist, philosopher, political commentator, and photographer (b.1929).
16 March – Raymond Nasher, American art collector (b.1921).

April to June
7 April – Johnny Hart, American cartoonist (b.1931).
8 April – Sol LeWitt, American conceptual and minimalist artist (b.1928).
10 April – Salvatore Scarpitta, American sculptor (b.1919).
15 April – Brant Parker, American cartoonist (b.1920).
17 April – Kitty Carlisle Hart, American singer, actress, and New York State Council on the Arts member (b.1910).
3 May – Warja Honegger-Lavater, Swiss artist and illustrator (b.1913).
26 May – James Beck, American art historian (b.1930).
28 May – Jörg Immendorff, German painter, sculptor, stage designer and art professor (b.1945; ALS).
2 June – Jerry Wilkerson, American painter (b.1943).
17 June – Gianfranco Ferré, Italian fashion designer (b.1944).
22 June – Bernd Becher, German photographer (b.1931).
26 June – Liz Claiborne, Belgian-born American fashion designer and entrepreneur (b.1929).

July to September
7 July – John Szarkowski, American photographer, curator, historian, and critic (b.1925).
17 July – Jeremy Blake, American digital artist and painter (b.1971).
22 July – Aleksandr Tatarskiy, Russian animator, artist, and film director (b.1950).
9 August – Joe O'Donnell, American photographer (b.1922).
11 August – Maurice Boitel, French painter (b.1919).
12 August 
Elizabeth Murray, American painter, printmaker, and draughtsman (b.1940).
Mike Wieringo, American comic book artist (b.1963).
17 August – Edward Avedisian, American abstract painter (b.1936).
24 September – Lenore Tawney, American fiber artist (b.1907).
25 September – André Emmerich, American gallerist.

October to December
5 October – Alexandra Boulat, French photographer (b.1962).
8 October – Constantine Andreou, Greek painter and sculptor (b.1917).
21 October 
R. B. Kitaj, American-born English artist (b.1932).
Ileana Sonnabend, art dealer and gallerist.
30 October – Norbert Lynton, British art historian and Professor of the History of Art (b.1927).
16 November – Paul Brach, American abstract painter, lecturer and educator (b.1924).
4 December
Norval Morrisseau, Aboriginal Canadian artist (b.1932).
Herman Rose 98, painter (b.1909).
7 December - Noel Forster, British painter (b.1932)
14 December – Ismail Gulgee, Pakistani painter (b.1926).
31 December 
 Michael Goldberg, American abstract expressionist painter and teacher (b. 1924).
 Ettore Sottsass, Italian architect and designer (b. 1917)

References

 
 
2000s in art
Years of the 21st century in art